Charles Ross Pringle (18 October 1894 – 1966) was a Scottish footballer who played as a wing half.

Career
Born in the village of Nitshill, south of Glasgow, Pringle's first professional club was St Mirren, for whom he signed during World War I. On 12 February 1921 he won his only cap for Scotland in a 2–1 win against Wales.

In 1922 Pringle signed for Manchester City, making his debut on 26 August 1922 in the opening game of the 1922–23 season, a 2–0 defeat at Sheffield United. He then proceeded to play in every Manchester City match for over a year. He was part of the Manchester City team which played in the 1926 FA Cup Final, and was captain for part of his City career. After winning a Second Division champions medal in 1927–28, Pringle left Manchester City in the close season as part of a venture to form a new club, Manchester Central F.C.

He later played for Bradford Park Avenue, Lincoln City and Stockport County. After his playing career finished he became a coach. His coaching career included a spell at his former club St Mirren.

Pringle married Lily Meredith, the daughter of fellow Manchester City player Billy Meredith, and played in the same team as his father-in-law seven times.

References

Sources

1894 births
1966 deaths
Lincoln City F.C. players
Manchester City F.C. players
Stockport County F.C. players
St Mirren F.C. players
Scottish footballers
Scotland international footballers
Scottish Junior Football Association players
Manchester Central F.C. players
Association football wing halves
Scottish Football League players
Scottish Football League representative players
English Football League players
Maryhill F.C. players
Bradford (Park Avenue) A.F.C. players
St Mirren F.C. non-playing staff
Footballers from Renfrewshire
FA Cup Final players